Lieutenant-General Tun Kyi (born May 1, 1938, in Monywa) is an officer of the Burmese military and a former minister of the Ministry of Commerce.

Biography
Tun Kyi attended the Basic Education High School in Monywa. He graduated from the Defence Services Academy as part of its first intake. Tun Kyi was named commander in 1988 in Mandalay. He was promoted as the minister of Ministry of Commerce at September 24, 1992. Lt-General Tun Kyi was the member of the State Law and Order Restoration Council and was Chairman of The Committee for Boosting Meat & Fish Production and Controlling Consumer Prices, and Committee for Boosting Marine Production

References

External links

http://www.meeway.com/index.php?q=aHR0cDovL3d3dy5pYmlibGlvLm9yZy9vYmwvcmVnLmJ1cm1hL2FyY2hpdmVzLzE5OTUwNi9tc2cwMDA0Mi5odG1s&hl=0

1938 births
Burmese military personnel
Living people
Defence Services Academy alumni
People from Sagaing Region